The Southern Owl Nebula (PLN 283+25.1, ESO 378-1) is a planetary nebula located in the constellation Hydra. The nebula lies at a distance of 2,030 light years from Earth.

It is named so because of its resemblance to the Owl Nebula in Ursa Major. The nebula is notably symmetric, round, and has a diameter of approximately four light-years across.

References 

Planetary nebulae
Hydra (constellation)